Thomas Joseph Blake (15 July 1872 – 3 May 1935) was an Australian rules footballer who played with Carlton and St Kilda in the Victorian Football League (VFL). He captained Carlton in the Victorian Football Association (VFA) during 1895 and 1896, but relinquished the captaincy to Jimmy Aitken after the club's entrance to the VFL. A year after leaving Carlton, St Kilda requested his experience after failing to win a match in the 1898 season. He went on to play 24 games with St Kilda across two seasons before leaving the league.

His brother James played alongside him in the VFA but did not make an appearance in the VFL. Two more Blake brothers, Mick and George, were footballers, the latter also competing as a track athlete in the Olympic Games.

Notes

External links 
	
		
Tom Blake's profile at Blueseum
	
		
1872 births		
1935 deaths		
Australian rules footballers from Melbourne
Carlton Football Club (VFA) players
Carlton Football Club players		
St Kilda Football Club players
People from St Kilda, Victoria